Hanoi University of Science and Technology (HUST; , fornerly known in English as Hanoi University of Technology (HUT)) until 2010, founded 1956, is the first and largest technical university in Vietnam.

History 
After the communists took control of Hanoi in 1956 after the victory at the Battle of Dien Bien Phu, the Soviet Union helped North Vietnam to build a new technical university as a frame for university education. The construction took about two years from the grounds of an old campus of Indochina University during the French colonial period. The building was the largest one in Hanoi.

The university is the fifth oldest in Vietnam, after Indochina Medical College (1902), University of Indochina(1904), École Supérieure des Beaux-Arts de l'Indochine (1925) and Hanoi University of Education (1951). It is the parent of many spin-off technical universities in Vietnam, including Hanoi University of Civil Engineering, Hanoi University of Mining and Geology, Vietnam University of Water Resource, etc. After the unification of Vietnam, many of its professors went to Ho Chi Minh City to rebuild Ho Chi Minh City University of Technology.

HUST is a multidisciplinary technical university. It always ranks first in technology training universities in Vietnam. Thousands of engineers have graduated from HUST and are now serving in key industrial and scientific areas. Many of them hold important positions in the government.

In 2007, the HUST staff consisted of 1950 people. Amongst them, there were 1192 in teaching staff, 394 in teaching-assistant and scientific research staff, 200 professors and associate-professors, 400 Ph.D. and D.S.c.

Currently, the number of students is about 40,000 making it the largest technical university in Vietnam. Despite of the large pool of students, the passmark (in the national university entrant exam) is among the highest: HUST is well known in Vietnam for its selective students. For instance, in 2005 national university entrant exam, more than half of perfect-score students came to HUST. In June 2019, 33,000 students bidding for 6,680 places. The strongest students benefit from the Elitech scheme, which includes the 5-year Excellent Engineer Training Programmes leading to a French CTI diploma.

To further promote scientific research and training activities besides technology transfer to develop HUST as a research-focused university, in May 2010 its name in English was changed to Hanoi University of Science and Technology (abbreviated HUST). However, the name in Vietnamese and French remain the same — Đại học Bách khoa Hà Nội and Institut Polytechnique de Hanoi respectively.

Campus 

HUST has one of the largest and most treed campus in Vietnam, just in the south center of Hanoi, looking out onto the Park of Reunification.

HUST's campus area is about 26 hectares with 200 amphitheatres, teaching rooms, halls, and conference chambers. It owns about 200 laboratories among which are 8 national key laboratories and 20 practical workshops. HUST has a large of complex for physical education and sport activities including a standard stadium, an Olympic size swimming pool, tennis courts, and international standard sporting event hall (where the South East Asia Student Sports Festival was organized in 2006).

University rankings

Academics

Schools, departments, and faculties
  
 School of Transportation Engineering
 School of Applied Mathematics and Informatics
 School of Chemical Engineering (CHEMENG)
 School of Engineering Physics (SEP)
 School of Economics and Management
 School of Electrical Engineering
 School of Electronics and Telecommunications (SET)
 School of Engineering Education
 School of Foreign Languages
 School of Information and Communication Technology
 School of Material Science and Technology
 School of Mechanical Engineering
 Faculty of Part-time Training
 Faculty of Social Science
 School of Text, Garment Technology and Fashion Design
 Department of Physical Education

Institutes and research centers
 Institute of Biological and Food Technology (IBFT)
 Institute of Engineering Physics (INEP)
 Institute for Environment Science and Technology (INEST)
 Institute of Heat Engineering and Refrigeration (IHERE)
 International Training Institute For Materials Science (ITIMS)
 Automation Research Center (ARC)
 Bach Khoa Internetwork Security Center (BKIS)
 Biomedical Electronics Center
 Center for Development and Application of Software for Industry (DASI)
 Center for Education and Development of Chromatography
 Center for High Performance Computing (HPC)
 Center for Research and Development of High Technology
 Center for Research and Consulting on Management
 Center for Talents Training
 Center for Technology Innovation (CTI) 
 Corrosion and Protection Research Center
 Inorganic Materials Research Center
 "Multimedia Information, Communication and Applications" (MICA) Institute
 International Training Programme and Centers
 KITECH-HUT Center
 Library and Information Network Center (LINC)
 Materials Science Center
 Polymer Center
 Polytechnology Company
 Precise Machinery Research Center
 Renewable Energy Research center (RERC)

Partner universities 
Hanoi University of Technology has set up cooperation in research and training with 200 universities, research institutes, and companies from 32 countries. The following are parts of this network:
  Australia: University of Technology Sydney, University of Monash, La Trobe University, RMIT
  Belgium: Vrije Universiteit Brussel, Katholieke Universiteit Leuven, University of Liège
  Canada:École Polytechnique de Montréal
  China: Tsinghua University, Harbin Institute of Technology, University of Science and Technology Beijing
  Finland: Lahti University of Applied Sciences
  France: University of Paris VI, École Polytechnique, AgroSup Dijon, INSA, UTBM
  Germany: Dresden University of Technology, Technische Universität Darmstadt, Leibniz University Hannover, Technische Universität Bergakademie Freiberg, University of Stuttgart, University of Leipzig, Technische Universität München
  Japan: Tokyo Institute of Technology, Gifu University, JAIST
  Republic of Korea: Konkuk University, Korea University, KAIST, Seoul National University, POSTECH, Kyungpook National University, KNU
  Russia: Moscow State University, Tomsk State University, Saint Petersburg State Electrotechnical University
  Singapore: National University of Singapore, Nanyang Technological University
  Sweden: Chalmers University of Technology
 Taiwan: National Tsinghua University, National Taiwan University of Science and Technology, National Formosa University, Ching Yun University
  United States: Troy University, University of Illinois at Urbana–Champaign, University of Florida, California State University

Notable alumni, faculty, and staff

Alumni
 Phạm Gia Khiêm, former Minister of Ministry of Science, Technology and Environment (11/1996–9/1997), former Deputy Prime Minister of Vietnam (10/1997–8/2011), former Minister of Ministry of Foreign Affairs (6/2006–8/2011)
 Hoang Trung Hai, former Deputy Prime Minister of Vietnam (8/2007–8/2016), Secretary of the Hanoi Party Committee (2/2016–present)
 Nguyễn Tử Quảng, CEO of Bkav
 Dong Nguyen, Flappy Bird creator
 Hoàng Minh Sơn, Vice Minister of Ministry of Education and Training

University presidents
 Trần Đại Nghĩa, 1956, former Deputy Minister of Industry and Commerce (1950–1960), former Minister of Heavy Industry (1960–1962), former chairman of the State Committee on Science and Technology for Vietnam (1965)
 Tạ Quang Bửu, 1956–1960, former Minister of Ministry of Defense (1947–1948), former Minister of Ministry of university and Secondary Education (1965–1976)
 Hoàng Xuân Tùy, 1961–1966, former Deputy Minister of Ministry of university and Secondary Education
 Phạm Đồng Điện, 7/1966–3/1980
 Hà Học Trạc, 3/1980–12/1989
 Hoàng Trọng Yêm, 12/1989–10/1994
 Nguyễn Minh Hiển, 10/1994–4/1997, former Minister of Ministry of Education and Training (6/1997–6/2006)
 Hoàng Văn Phong, 5/1997–11/2002, former Minister of Ministry of Science and Technology (8/2000–8/2011)
 Trần Quốc Thắng, 12/2002–11/2004, former Deputy Minister of Ministry of Science and Technology (2004–10/2009)
 Hoàng Bá Chư, 12/2004–6/2008
 Nguyễn Trọng Giảng, 6/2008–10/2014
 Hoàng Minh Sơn, 7/2015–10/2020
 Huỳnh Quyết Thắng, 10/2020–present

Gallery

References

External links 
 

Hanoi University of Science and Technology
Technical universities and colleges in Vietnam
Engineering universities and colleges in Vietnam